The Alliance for a Triumphant Benin (ABT) is a political alliance in Benin led by Abdoulaye Bio Tchané.

History
The alliance received 3.7% of the vote in the 2015 parliamentary elections, winning two seats.

References

Political party alliances in Benin